The Flume Gorge (locally, just The Flume) is a natural gorge extending  horizontally at the base of Mount Liberty in Franconia Notch State Park, New Hampshire, United States. Discovered in 1808 by 93-year-old "Aunt" Jess Guernsey, the Flume is now a paid attraction that allows visitors to walk through it from May 10 to October 20. Pets are not allowed.

Geology 
Nearly 200 million years ago in the Jurassic period, the Conway granite that forms the walls of the Flume was deeply buried molten rock. As it cooled, the granite was broken by closely spaced vertical fractures that lay nearly parallel in a northeasterly direction. Sometime after the fractures were formed, small dikes of basalt were forced up along the fractures. The basalt came from deep within the earth as a fluid material, and because of pressure, was able to force the Conway granite aside. The basalt crystallized quickly against the relatively cold granite. Because of this quick cooling, the basalt is a fine-grained rock. Had this material ever reached the surface, it would have become lava flows.

Erosion gradually lowered the earth's surface and exposed the dikes. As the overlying rock was worn away, pressure was relieved and horizontal cracks developed, allowing water to get into the rock layers. The basalt dikes eroded faster than the surrounding Conway granite, creating a deepening valley where the gorge is now.
The gorge was covered by glaciers during the Ice Age, but the ice sheet did not greatly change the surface. It partially filled the valley with glacial debris and removed soil and weathered rock from the vicinity. After the Ice Age, Flume Brook began to flow through the valley again.

The highly fractured granite and basalt have been eroded by frost action and by the brook's water. As one walks through the Flume Gorge, at the floor one may notice remnants of the main basalt dike, and that small trees are growing on the walls of the gorge. Erosion is still occurring.

Discovery 

The Flume was discovered in 1808 by 93-year-old "Aunt" Jess Guernsey when she accidentally came upon it while fishing. She had trouble convincing her family of the marvelous discovery, but eventually persuaded others to come and see for themselves. 

At that time, a huge, egg-shaped boulder hung suspended between the walls. A heavy rainstorm in June 1883 started a landslide that swept the boulder from its place. The boulder has never been found. The same storm deepened the gorge and formed Avalanche Falls.

See also 
 Franconia Notch
 Mount Flume

References

External links 

Flume Gorge and Visitor Center, NH Division of Parks & Recreation

1808 in science
Canyons and gorges of New Hampshire
Landmarks in New Hampshire
Parks in Grafton County, New Hampshire
Waterfalls of New Hampshire
Landforms of Grafton County, New Hampshire
Lincoln, New Hampshire